A by-election was held for the New South Wales Legislative Assembly electorate of Western Division of Camden on 16 June 1856 because James Macarthur was concerned about the constitutionality of the transition to responsible government and resigned.

Dates

Result

James Macarthur was concerned about the constitutionality of the transition to responsible government and resigned.

See also
Electoral results for the district of Western Division of Camden
List of New South Wales state by-elections

References

1856 elections in Australia
New South Wales state by-elections
1850s in New South Wales